Bitter Springs is a 1950 Australian–British film directed by Ralph Smart. An Australian pioneer family leases a piece of land from the government in the Australian outback in 1900 and hires two inexperienced British men as drovers. Problems with local Aboriginal people arise over the possession of a waterhole. 
Much of the film was shot on location in the Flinders Ranges in South Australia

Plot
In the early 1900s, Wally King travels 600 miles to outback South Australia to occupy land he has leased from the government. He is accompanied by his wife Ma, children Emma and John, and friends Tommy and Mac. Despite warnings from a local trooper, the bigoted King clashes with an Aboriginal tribe who depend on water located on what has become the family's property.

Relations with the local Aboriginal people deteriorate to the point where John King is speared. The Kings are in danger of being killed by a raiding party but they are rescued by the trooper and his men. A compromise is reached where the Kings agree to work with the Aboriginal people running a sheep station.

Cast
 Tommy Trinder as Tommy
 Chips Rafferty as Wally King
 Gordon Jackson as Mac
 Jean Blue as Ma King
 Michael Pate as Trooper
 Charles 'Bud' Tingwell as John King
 Nonnie Piper as Emma King
 Nicky Yardley as Charlie
 Henry Murdoch as Blackjack

Development

Pepper Trees
Following the success of The Overlanders, Ealing Studios decided to make a series of movies in Australia. The first one was Eureka Stockade. In October 1948 Ealing announced they would follow Stockade with Pepper Trees, a comedy about new immigrants to Australia. It would be written and directed by Ralph Smart, who had made Bush Christmas, and star Chips Rafferty and Tommy Trinder. Filming would begin in March 1949. They hoped to cast Gordon Jackson as the third lead and an Australian girl in the female lead part. It was intended to follow Pepper Springs with Robbery Under Arms.

In November 1948 a columnist for the ABC Weekly said he had "read the story of Pepper Trees" and that it "Should be an amusing vehicle for Trinder, Rafferty, Gordon Jackson, and an unchosen girl. But I'm betting Tommy and Chips will want their parts built up. In the rough, the girl could steal the picture."

By December there was some doubt if Trinder would make the movie.

In January 1949 Ealing announced that instead of Pepper Trees, Rafferty and Tommy Trinder would appear in a "light comedy" called Bitter Springs.

Bitter Springs
The film was the idea of Ralph Smart and roughly based on an apparently true story. This was the third movie Ealing Studios made in Australia following the success of The Overlanders (1946). It was originally announced as a comedy starring Rafferty and Trinder, and was meant to be followed by a version of Robbery Under Arms.

Tommy Trinder's part was created especially for him to ensure the movie had some comic relief. Nick Yardley had previously appeared in Ralph Smart's Bush Christmas. Nonnie Piper was a 19-year-old model.

The original script ended with the massacre of Aboriginal people at the hands of the white settlers, but this was changed at the insistence of Ealing Studios.

Ralph Smart scouted around Australia for locations and at one stage it seemed that the film would be made in Murgon, Queensland but eventually it was decided to make it in South Australia.

Writer Dave Moore flew out to Australia to help with the script.

Shooting
Filming started in May 1949. Location shooting was completed in November, nearly two months behind schedule due to rain delays, and was followed by two weeks at Pagewood Studios in Sydney.

130 Aboriginal people were used as extras. They had nowhere to stay when they arrived due to an administrative oversight and their treatment on set was criticised. Ealing wanted to pay Aboriginal actor Henry Murdoch the same as white actors but the Department of Native Affairs refused, only granting him a regular allowance.

During filming a man went around Adelaide pretending to be a talent scout for the film offering women the chance to appear in it.

Leslie Norman is credited as associate producer. He later recalled "I went out [to Australia] as a sort of hatchet man. It was a shame, but that film was awkward, a bit stiff and staid."

Release
The film had its world premiere in Adelaide, which was attended by Don Bradman. Although reviews were generally respectful the film was a box office disappointment on release and Ealing abandoned its plans to make further movies in Australia. (During filming, in June 1949, Ealing said that Ralph Smart would make Robbery Under Arms afterwards.)

It sold off Pagewood Studios in 1952.

Filmink magazine said "It's weird that Ealing Films thought this movie would be commercial… maybe they had visions of something like Cimarron, only there's hardly any female characters in it... In the filmmakers' defence, their hearts were in the right place and at least the film tries to tackle head on some of the issues of Australian settlement. And I actually think it could have found an audience had the filmmakers told the story from the point of view of female characters, like the later We of the Never Never. But Ealing, for all their progressive politics, were lousy at making films with female protagonists."

See also
 Cinema of Australia

References

External links
 
 Bitter Springs at Australian Screen Online
 Bitter Springs at BFI Screenonline
 Article on Bitter Springs at Senses of Cinema
 BFI film info
 Bitter Springs at Oz Movies
 Review of film at Variety

1950s Australian films
1950 films
1950s historical films
Australian black-and-white films
British black-and-white films
British historical films
Ealing Studios films
1950s English-language films
Films directed by Ralph Smart
Films set in 1900
Films set in South Australia
Films shot in Flinders Ranges
Films about Aboriginal Australians
1950s British films